The Mount School may refer to:

 The Mount School, Mill Hill, an independent GSA day school in Mill Hill, London, England, for girls aged 3–16
 The Mount School, York, a Quaker independent GSA day and boarding school in York, England, for girls aged 11–18